6-MeO-THH, or 6-methoxy-1,2,3,4-tetrahydroharman, is a β-carboline (or more specifically a pinoline) derivative and a structural isomer of tetrahydroharmine  (7-MeO-THH). 6-MeO-THH is mentioned in  Alexander Shulgin's book TiHKAL (Tryptamines I Have Known and Loved), stating that 6-MeO-THH is very similar to the other carbolines. Limited testing suggests that it possesses mild psychoactive effects at 1.5 mg/kg and is said to be about one-third as potent as 6-methoxyharmalan. It has been isolated from certain plants of the Virola family.

Pharmacology
Very little is known about the psychoactivity of 6-MeO-THH in humans. Studies in rats have shown it to bind to a number of  serotonin 5-HT1 receptors and 5-HT2 receptors, dopamine D2 receptors, benzodiazepine receptors, and imidazoline receptors.

See also 
 Beta-carboline
 Harmala alkaloid
 Tryptamine

References 

Psychedelic tryptamines
Beta-Carbolines